Hooked on Classics, produced by Jeff Jarratt and Don Reedman, is a multi-million selling  album recorded by Louis Clark and the Royal Philharmonic Orchestra, published in 1981 by K-tel and distributed by RCA Records, part of the Hooked on Classics series.

The opening track was called "Hooked On Classics (Parts 1 & 2)". A unique arrangement of this track, simply called "Hooked on Classics", was released as a single in July 1981, and was the version predominately played by radio.  It peaked at number 2 in the UK, number 10 in the US, and number 21 in Canada.

In Germany and Austria, the album was released titled "Classic Disco" and reached number one in both countries.

The single
The opening track was called "Hooked On Classics (Parts 1 & 2)". A unique arrangement of this track, simply called "Hooked on Classics", was released as a single in July 1981, and was the version predominately played by radio. With a listed time of 3'48", it contained the first five pieces of the album cut, skipping the next five (Beethoven's "Symphony No. 5, 1st Movement" through Rossini's "William Tell Overture"), followed by the remaining pieces. Though not listed as such on the single's label or in the Performance Rights Organization's database, it is implied this portion is "Part 1". The B-side of the single, also called "Hooked On Classics" and lasting 2'13", begins with the fifth piece from "Part 1" (Sibelius' "Karelia Suite, Intermezzo"), contains the missing five pieces found on the album cut, and concludes with the remaining pieces through "March of the Toreadors" which fades out, as opposed to the album cut and "Part 1"'s cold ending of the "1812 Overture". Presumably this is "Part 2". The label of the single incorrectly omits the "1812 Overture" from the list of pieces in the "Part 1" medley.

The single peaked at number 2 in the UK and later in the US at number 10 on the Billboard Hot 100 in February 1982. It was the 56th biggest hit of that year. The song also reached number 10 on the Cash Box Top 100.  In Canada, it peaked at number 21, and spent four weeks at that position.  "Hooked on Classics" also reached number one on the Canadian Adult Contemporary chart.

Chart performance "Hooked On Classics (Part 1)"

Weekly charts

Year-end charts

Grammy nominations

|-
| rowspan="1" | 1981
| rowspan="1" | Hooked on Classics (Single)
| Best Pop Instrumental Performance
| 
|-
| rowspan="1" | 1982
| rowspan="1" | Hooked on Classics (Album)
| Best Pop Instrumental Performance
| 
|-
|}

Track listing
Hooked On Classics (Parts 1 & 2) - 5:06

Piano Concerto No. 1 in B♭ Minor, Op. 23, I: Allegro non troppo e molto maestoso / Pyotr Ilyich Tchaikovsky
 Flight of the Bumblebee / Nicolai Rimsky-Korsakov
 Symphony No. 40 in G Minor, K. 550, I: Allegro molto / Wolfgang Amadeus Mozart
 Rhapsody in Blue / George Gershwin
 Karelia Suite, Op. 11, I: Intermezzo / Jean Sibelius
 Symphony No. 5 in C Minor, Op. 67, I: Allegro con brio / Ludwig van Beethoven
 Toccata and Fugue in D minor, BWV 565, Toccata / J.S. Bach
 Serenade No. 13 in G Major, K. 525, “Eine Kleine Nachtmusik”, I: Allegro / Wolfgang Amadeus Mozart
 Symphony No. 9 in D Minor, Op. 125, IV: Presto- Allegro assai / Ludwig van Beethoven
 William Tell Overture / Giacchino Rossini
 The Marriage of Figaro, K. 492, Act 2: "Voi Che Sapete" / Wolfgang Amadeus Mozart
 Romeo and Juliet Fantasy Overture / Pyotr Ilyich Tchaikovsky
 Prince of Denmark's March / Jeremiah Clarke 
 Messiah, HWV 56, Part 2, No. 44: Hallelujah Chorus / George Frederic Handel
 Piano Concerto in A Minor, Op. 16 I: Allegro molto moderato / Edvard Grieg
 Carmen Suite No. 1, V: Les Toréadors / Georges Bizet
  1812 Overture, Op. 49 / Pyotr Ilyich Tchaikovsky

 Hooked on Romance - 6:42

 Orchestral Suite No. 3 in D Major, BWV 1068, II: Air / J.S. Bach
 Ave Maria, Op. 52, No. 6 / Franz Schubert
 Liebesträume No. 3 in A♭ Major / Liszt
 Symphony No. 9 in D Minor, Op. 125, III: Adagio molto e cantabile / Beethoven
 Rhapsody on a Theme of Paganini, Op. 43, Variation XVIII: Andante cantabile / Sergei Rachmaninov
 Piano Sonata No. 14 in C# Minor, Op 27, No. 2 "Moonlight", I: Adagio sostenuto / Beethoven
 Piano Sonata No. 8 in C Minor, Op. 13 "Pathetique", II: Adagio cantabile / Beethoven
 Clarinet Concerto in A Major, K. 622, II: Adagio / Mozart
 Xerxes "Ombra mai fu" (Largo) / Handel

 Hooked On Classics (Part 3) - 6:02

 A Midsummer Night's Dream, Op. 61, IX: Wedding March / Felix Mendelssohn
 Radetzky March, Op. 228 / Johann Strauss I
 Symphony No. 5 for Organ, Op 42, No. 1, V: Toccata / Charles Marie Widor
 Water Music Suite No. 2 in D Major, Alla Hornpipe / Handel
 Humoresque No. 7 in G♭ Major, Op. 101 / Antonin Dvořák
 Wiegenlied, Op. 49, No. 4 (Lullaby) / Johannes Brahms
 Solomon, HWV 67, Act 3: Arrival of the Queen of Sheba / Handel
 Pictures at an Exhibition, I: Promenade / Modest Mussorgsky
 Peer Gynt Suite No. 1, Op. 23a, IV: In the Hall of the Mountain King / Grieg
 Caprice No. 24 in A Minor / Niccolo Paganini
 Die Walküre, Act 3, No. 1: Ride of the Valkyries / Richard Wagner
 Fingal's Cave / Mendelssohn
 Military March No. 1 in D Major, Op. 51 / Franz Schubert
 Polonaise in A Major, Op. 40, No. 1 / Frederic Chopin
 Symphony No. 4 in A Major, Op. 90, "Italian" I: Allegro vivace / Mendelssohn
 Light Cavalry Overture / Franz von Suppé
 L'Arlésienne Suite No. 2, IV: Farandole / Bizet
 Symphony No. 9 in E Minor, Op. 95, "From the New World", II: Largo / Dvořák
 Lohengrin, Prelude to Act 3 / Wagner

 Hooked On Bach - 5:59 (All music composed by Johann Sebastian Bach)

 Ave Maria, “Méditation sur le Premier Prélude de Piano de J. S. Bach” / Charles Gounod
 Minuet in G Major, BWV Anh. 114
 Orchestral Suite No. 2 in B Minor, BWV 1067, VII: Badinerie
 Brandenburg Concerto No. 3 in G Major, BWV 1048, I
 Brandenburg Concerto No. 2 in F Major, BWV 1047, I
 St. Matthew Passion, BWV 244, Stanza 5, No. 15: Erkenne mich, mein Hüter
 Orchestral Suite No. 2 in B Minor, BWV 1067,  IV: Bourrée (No. 2)
 Orchestral Suite No. 2 in B Minor, BWV 1067,  IV: Bourrée (No. 1)
 Orchestral Suite No. 3 in D Major, BWV 1068, III: Gavotte
 Musette in D Major, BWV Anh. 126
 March in D Major, BWV Anh. 122
 French Suite No. 5 in G Major, BWV 816, IV: Gavotte
 Wachet auf, ruft uns die Stimme, BWV 140
 Ave Maria

 Hooked On Tchaikovsky - 5:29 (All music composed by Pyotr Illyich Tchaikovsky)

 Capriccio Italien, Op. 45
 Swan Lake Suite, Op. 20a, I: Scene
 The Nutcracker Suite, Op. 71a, VII: Dance of the Reed Flutes 
 Romeo & Juliet Fantasy Overture
 Symphony No. 6 in B Minor, Op. 74 “Pathetique”, I: Adagio
 The Nutcracker Suite, Op. 71a, IV: Trepak (Russian Dance)
 The Nutcracker Suite, Op. 71a, III: Dance of the Sugar Plum Fairy 
 The Nutcracker Suite, Op. 71a, II: March 
 The Nutcracker Suite, Op. 71a, VI: Chinese Dance 
 The Nutcracker Suite, Op. 71a, I: Miniature Overture 
 Piano Concerto No. 1 in B♭ Minor, Op. 23, I: Allegro non troppo e molto maestoso
 Capriccio Italien 

 Hooked On A Song - 5:11

 Carmen, Act 2, “Votre toast, je peux vous le rendre” (Toreador Song) / Bizet
 Funiculì, Funiculà / Luigi Denza
 Tarantella Napoletana / Rossini
 Prince Igor, Act 2, Polovtsian Dances / Alexander Borodin
 La Gioconda, Act 3, Dance of the Hours / Amilcare Ponchielli
 Carmen, Act 1, No. 5, ”L'amour est un oiseau rebelle” (Habanera) / Bizet
 Neapolitan Serenade (O sole mio) / Eduardo di Capua
 Madama Butterfly, Act 2, No. 2, "Un bel dì vedremo” / Giacomo Puccini
 Il Trovatore, Act 2, No. 1, “Vedi! Le Fosche Notturne Spogli” (Anvil Chorus) / Giuseppe Verdi
 Votre Toast (Reprise) / Bizet

 Hooked On Mozart - 4:09 (All music composed by Wolfgang Amadeus Mozart)

 Piano Sonata No. 11 in A Major, K.331, III: Rondo (Alla Turca)
 Piano Sonata No. 16 in C Major, K. 545, I: Allegro 
 Serenade No. 13 in G Major, K. 525, “Eine Kleine Nachtmusik”, II: Andante (Romanza)
 Piano Concerto No. 21 in C Major, K. 467, II: Andante 
 Piano Sonata No. 16 in C Major, K. 545, I: Allegro 
 Divertimento in F Major, "Ein musikalischer Spaß" (A Musical Joke), K. 522, IV: Presto
 The Marriage of Figaro, K. 492, Act 1, No. 20, "Non più andrai"
 The Marriage of Figaro, K. 492, Overture
 Serenade No. 13 in G Major, K. 525, “Eine Kleine Nachtmusik”, IV: Allegro
 The Magic Flute, K. 620, Overture
 Horn Concerto No. 4 in E♭ Major, K. 495, III: Rondo: Allegro Vivace
 Piano Sonata No. 11 in A Major, K.331, III: Rondo (Alla Turca) (briefly) 
 Symphony No. 41 in C Major, K. 551 "Jupiter", I: Allegro vivace (briefly)

 Hooked On Mendelssohn 4:25

 Violin Concerto in E Minor, Op. 64, III: Allegro molto vivace
 Octet in E♭ Major, Op. 20, III: Scherzo
 Violin Concerto in E Minor, Op. 64, III: Allegro molto vivace

 Hooked On A Can-Can - 4:56

 Orpheus in the Underworld, Infernal Galop (Can-Can) / Jacques Offenbach
 Unter Donner und Blitz (Thunder and Lightning) Polka, Op. 324 / Johann Strauss II
 Hungarian Dance No. 5 in G Minor / Brahms
 Tritsch Tratsch Polka, Op. 214 / Johann Strauss II
 La Vie Parisienne Overture / Offenbach
 La Gioconda, Act 3, Dance of the Hours / Ponchielli
 Csárdás / Vittorio Monti
 La Vie Parisienne Overture / Offenbach
 Poet and Peasant Overture / Suppé
 Can-Can (Reprise) / Offenbach

References

External links
 

1981 albums
Royal Philharmonic Orchestra albums
RCA Records albums
Hooked on Classics albums